Waters Edge is the eighth studio album by British glam rock band Sweet, released in 1980.

Track listing
All songs written and composed by Steve Priest, Andy Scott and Mick Tucker except where noted.

European release
"Sixties Man" (Peter Hutchins, Pip Williams) - 4:12
"Getting in the Mood for Love" - 3:04
"Tell the Truth" (Priest, Scott, Gary Moberley) - 3:34
"Own Up" - 3:19
"Too Much Talking" (Ray McRiner) - 3:57
"Thank You for Loving Me" (Scott, Moberley) - 3:43
"At Midnight" (Scott) - 3:20
"Waters Edge" - 2:59
"Hot Shot Gambler" (Priest) - 3:34
"Give the Lady Some Respect" (McRiner) - 4:30

The song "Own Up" is different from "Own Up, Take a Look at Yourself", released as B-side to the single "Teenage Rampage" in 1974.

Bonus tracks on 2010 reissue
  "Tall Girls" - 4:30
 "Oh Yeah!" - 2:21
 "Sixties Man" (single version) - 3:52
 "Give The Lady Some Respect" (single version) - 3:27

US/Canada release (LP only)
This album was released in the US and Canada under the title VI with different cover and sleeve. VI is a generic title referring to the fact that this was Sweet's sixth album released on Capitol Records. The track listing also differed from the Polydor version:

Side One
"Sixties Man" - 4:08
"Own Up" - 3:16
"Too Much Talking" - 3:57
"Tell the Truth" - 3:30
"Getting in the Mood for Love" (edited) - 3:01

Side Two
"Thank You for Loving Me" - 3:40
"At Midnight" - 3:16
"Waters Edge" - 2:54
"Hot Shot Gambler" - 3:32
"Give the Lady Some Respect" (single version) - 3:27

To date, the VI version of this album has never been reissued on CD.

Personnel
Sweet
Steve Priest - bass guitar, lead vocals (tracks 1, 2, 8, 9, 10), co-lead vocals (tracks 3, 6), backing vocals
Andy Scott - guitars, synthesisers, lead vocals (tracks 5, 7), co-lead vocals (tracks 3, 6), backing vocals
Mick Tucker - drums, percussion, lead vocals (track 4), backing vocals

Additional personnel
Gary Moberley - keyboards
Pip Williams - production (tracks 1, 10)

References

The Sweet albums
1980 albums
Polydor Records albums
Albums produced by Pip Williams